University of Rwanda is a public collegiate, multi campus university based in Kigali, Rwanda. Formed in 2013 through the merger of previously independent education institutions, the University of Rwanda is the largest education institution in Rwanda. The University of Rwanda is ranked number one in the country by Higher Education Council, an organ established by the Government of Rwanda. 

Today the University of Rwanda is composed of 6 independent and self-governing colleges operating in 8 campus. The University hosts a number of centers including four African Centre of Excellence established by World Bank. During the 2011 academic year, the university had 24,084 students, of whom 8% are enrolled in postgraduates studies.

History
Initial work to establish the institution was undertaken by Professor Paul Davenport, a member of Paul Kagame's Presidential Advisory Council, who now acts as chair of the university's board of governors. The University of Rwanda was established in September 2013 by a law that repealed the laws establishing the National University of Rwanda and the country's other public higher education institutes, creating the UR in their place.

Law number 71/2013 transferred the contracts, activities, assets, liabilities and denominations of seven institutions to the UR:

 the National University of Rwanda (UNR)
 the Kigali Institute of Science and Technology (KIST)
 the Kigali Institute of Education (KIE; Ishuri Rikuru Nderabarezi rya  Kigali/Institut Supérieur Pédagogique de Kigali)
 the Higher Institute of Agriculture and Animal Husbandry (Institut Supérieur d’Agriculture et d’Elevage, ISAE/Ishuri Rikuru ry’Ubuhinzi n’Ubworozi)
 the School of Finance and Banking (SFB, Ishuri Rikuru ritanga inyigisho mu byerekeye Imari n’Amabanki/École des Finances et des Banques)
 the Higher Institute of Umutara Polytechnic (UP; Ishuri rikuru "Umutara Polytechnic"/Institut Supérieur d’Umutara Polytechnique)
 the Kigali Health Institute (KHI; Ishuri Rikuru ry’Ubuzima ry’ i Kigali/Institut Supérieur de Santé de Kigali)

At the time of its creation, education officials reported that they "hoped that the university will improve the quality of education and effectively respond to current national and global needs". Eugene Kwibuka of the Rwandan newspaper The New Times reports that many of the university's senior managers are well-established scholars with records of improving the performance of their previous institutions, but that many of them "are also well known elite Rwandans or dedicated friends of Rwanda and advisors to President Kagame, who have recently contributed to the development of the education sector in Rwanda or have recently been involved with designing the newly created University of Rwanda". A key challenge facing the university is argued to be a lack of qualified lecturers.

A 2015 article published in the Annals of Global Health, for example, notes that in the School of Public Health, part of the College of Medicine and Health Sciences, a barrier to the university merger's goal of improving the quality of higher education teaching and research in Rwanda is "limited skilled academic staff". The School employs six PhD-level and six master's-level faculty, as well as five research assistants. Moreover, it delivers a large number of degree programmes and has a "disproportionate student-supervisor ratio" of 15 students per PhD-holding faculty member. 

The university leadership plans to increase the proportion of academic staff holding doctoral degrees from 20 per cent to 60 per cent by 2024. In February 2019, it was announced that the university would start offering a master's degree in Kinyarwanda.

Organisation and administration
The organization of the University of Rwanda's Leadership is divided into five levels.

Chancellor 
The Chancellor of The University of Rwanda is appointed by Presidential Order. The Chancellor has a ceremonial role of opening the UR academic year, presiding over graduation ceremonies and granting other awards. The current chancellor is Patricia Campbell, who is the chief administrative officer of Tufts University. Campbell took over the role from Mike O'Neal, former president of Oklahoma Christian University.

Board of Governors 
The Board of Governors is the governing and decision-making organ of the University. Members of the Board of Governors of UR, including the Chairperson and the Deputy Chairperson are appointed by the President on the basis of their ability, competence and expertise. In addition to members appointed by a Presidential Order, there are members of the Board of Governors by virtue of managerial positions they hold in UR, and members who represent teachers, researchers, staff and students of UR. At least thirty per cent (30 %) of the members of the Board of Governors must be females. Paul Davenport is the founding Chair of the UR Board.

Academic Senate 
The Academic Senate is the senior organ responsible for academic affairs, research, and education in UR. The Academic Senate of the University of Rwanda  is composed of the following persons: The Vice-Chancellor, Deputy Vice-Chancellors, Principals of Colleges, a Dean from each College elected by the Deans of that College, the Registrar of the University, an academic staff from each College, elected by peers and a student from each College elected by peers.

Senior Management of the University of Rwanda 
The University of Rwanda senior management is compreised of the Vice Chancellor, the Deputy Vice Chancellor in charge of Academic Affairs and Research, the Deputy Vice Chancellor in charge of Strategic Planning and Administration and the Deputy Vice Chancellor in charge of Finance. Since July 2022, The university's vice-chancellor is Dr. Didas Muganga Kayihura, who took over the role from Prof Alexandre Lyambabaje. Other former Vice Chancellor are Phillip Cotton and Northern Irish botanist Professor James McWha.

College Principals 
The University of Rwanda is organized  into six subject-based colleges:
College of Arts and Social Sciences (CASS, Koleji yigisha iby’Indimi n’Ubumenyi bw’Imibereho y‘Abaturage/Collège des Lettres et Sciences Sociales)
College of Agriculture, Animal Sciences and Veterinary Medicine (CAVM, Koleji y’Ubuhinzi, Ubumenyi n‘ubuvuzi bw‘Amatungo/Collège d’Agriculture, des Sciences Animales et Médecine Vétérinaire)
College of Business and Economics (CBE, Koleji yigisha iby’Ubucuruzi n’Ubukungu/Collège des Affaires et de l’Economie)
College of Education (CE, Koleji Nderabarezi/Collège de l’Education).
College of Medicine and Health Sciences (CMHS; Koleji y’Ubuvuzi n’Ubuzima/Collège des Sciences de Médecine et de Santé)
College of Science and Technology (CST, Koleji y‘Ubumenyi n‘Ikoranabuhanga/Collège des Sciences et Technologies)

Campus Tour 

The university of Rwanda offers courses via its six colleges distributed around 9 campuses:
 Gikondo Campus: Gikondo campus is situated in Kigali in the former School of Finance and Banking. This campus houses the headquarters of University of Rwanda and is the seat of College of Business and Economics. In addition, this campus host the African Centre of Excellence in Data science. 
 Remera Campus: Remera campus is located in Kigali City in the former Kigali Institute of Education (KIE). Currently the campus hosts the college of medicine and health sciences. 
 Nyarugenge Campus: Nyarugenge Campus is located in the heart of Kigali City in the compounds that housed Kigali Institute of Science and Technology (KIST) and Kigali Health Institute (KHI). Nowadays, this campus is the headquarters of the College of Science and Technology.  
 Huye Campus: Located in the Southern Province, Huye Campus is the largest UR Campus both by land area and by the number of students. Huye Campus is currently the seat of College of Arts and Sciences although the campus provides programmes for students from other colleges. 
 Busogo Campus: Busogo campus is the seat of the college of agriculture and veterinary medicine. Busogo campus is located in Musanze District near Volcanoes National Park, the home of gorillas. 
 Nyagatare Campus: Nyagatare campus is located in the Eastern Province near the Akagera National Park. The campus houses students from the college of agriculture and veterinary medicine. 
 Rusizi Campus: Rusizi Campus is located in the West Province and provides programmes related to Business and Economics. 
 Rukara Campus: Rukara campus is the seat of the College of Education. It is located in the Eastern Provice at the outskirt of Muhazi Lake. 
 Rwamagama Campus

Academic profile

Teaching and Learning 
The University of Rwanda provides residential programs in six constituent colleges dispersed around nine campuses. In the academic year 2020, over 25,000 students were enrolled at the University. As of 2021, through its constituent colleges, the University of Rwanda offers 130 undergraduate degrees and diploma. The university also offers postgraduate programs in 70 subjects including PhDs.  99.4 per cent of UR students are Rwandan nationals. It employs 1,450 academics and 816 support and administrative staff. Through the partnership with the World Bank and the Inter-university Council of East Africa, the University of Rwanda is home to four African Centers of Excellence.

Partnerships 
UR participates in a number of international collaborations. In February 2015, the University of Rwanda and Michigan State University launched a joint MSc degree programme in agribusiness, assisted by United States Agency for International Development funding. The programme aims to help Rwandan women establish themselves in agribusiness. The Swedish International Development Cooperation Agency is funding research capacity development in Rwanda through the university.

Noted people
Agnes Binagwaho, Rwanda's health minister, became the first person to be awarded a PhD by the new University of Rwanda in August 2014. Binagwaho, whose research concerned children's health rights in the context of HIV/AIDS, started her PhD in 2008, prior to the university merger; it was Butare university.

References

External links

2013 establishments in Rwanda
Educational institutions established in 2013
Universities in Rwanda